Google supports its Chromebook chipsets for a maximum of 6.5 years. As of November 2020 2019, ChromiumOS reports the product end of life date in the "About this Chromebook" section of device settings.

The hardware generation and Linux kernel version of most products can be inferred from the code name and its corresponding video game series:

Notes

References

Cloud clients
Google Chrome
 
Google lists
Smartbooks